A grammeme in linguistics is a unit of grammar, just as a lexeme is a lexical unit and a morpheme is a morphological unit. (See emic unit.)

More specifically, a grammeme is a value of a grammatical category. For example, singular and plural are grammemes of the category of number.

Grammeme, earlier spelt grameme, was the original term used by Pike's school for what they went on to call the tagmeme.

References

Further reading 
 Lareau, François. "2 The notions of grammeme and grammatical unit." Igor Boguslavsky and Leo Wanner (eds.): 146.

Linguistic units